Prince Wilhelm Eitel Friedrich Christian Karl of Prussia (7 July 1883 – 8 December 1942) was the second son of Emperor Wilhelm II of Germany by his first wife, Princess Augusta Viktoria of Schleswig-Holstein-Sonderburg-Augustenburg. He was born and died in Potsdam, Germany.

Life and activities
Prince Eitel Friedrich was born on 7 July 1883 as the second son of the then Prince Wilhelm of Prussia, and his first wife, Princess Augusta Victoria of Schleswig-Holstein. He was born in the Marmorpalais of Potsdam in the Province of Brandenburg, where his parents resided until his father acceded to the throne as Emperor Wilhelm II in 1888. He spent his childhood with his siblings at the New Palace, also in Potsdam, and his school days with his brothers at the Prinzenhaus in Plön in his mother’s ancestral Schleswig-Holstein.

On 27 February 1906, Prince Eitel married Duchess Sophia Charlotte of Oldenburg (2 February 1879 Oldenburg – 29 March 1964 Westerstede) in Berlin. They were divorced on 20 October 1926 on the grounds of her adultery before the war. They had no children.

Raised at the cadet corps of Plön Castle, Prince Eitel was in the front line from the beginning of World War I and was wounded at Bapaume, where he commanded the Prussian First Foot Guards. He temporarily relinquished command to Count Hans von Blumenthal, but returned to duty before the end of the year. The following year, he was transferred to the Eastern Front. During the summer of 1915,  he was out in a field in Russia when he had a chance encounter with Manfred von Richthofen, who had just crashed with his superior officer, Count Holck. The two men were hiding in a nearby tree line from what they thought was the advancing Russian army and who turned out to be the grenadiers, guardsmen, and officers of Prince Eitel.

In 1907, it was reported that Member of the Reichstag Otto Arendt had proposed the elevation of Alsace-Lorraine to a grand duchy within the empire, with Eitel Friedrich as monarch; however, while the Kaiser did express interest, ultimately nothing came of the plan.

After the war, he was engaged in monarchist circles and Der Stahlhelm ex-servicemens' organization. In 1921, the Berlin criminal court found him guilty of the fraudulent transfer of 300,000 Marks and sentenced him to a fine of 5000 Marks.

From 1907 to 1926, he was Master of the Knights (Herrenmeister) of the Order of St. John (Johanniterorden).  He received the Pour le Mérite order in 1915.  His body is buried at the Antique Temple in Sanssouci Park, Potsdam.

Regimental Commissions 
  Hauptmann (captain) and commander of the Leibkompagnie (Life-company), 1. Garderegiment zu Fuß (1st Regiment of Foot Guards)
  à la suite, Grenadierregiment König Friedrich Wilhelm IV.(1. Pommersches) Nr. 2
  à la suite, 1. Gardelandwehrregiment (Guard Reserve Regiment)
  Hauptmann (captain), Austria-Hungary K.u.K. Infantry Regiment "Wilhelm I., Deutscher Kaiser und König von Preußen" Nr. 34
  Hauptmann (captain), Saxon Army
  à la suite, 7. Königsinfanterieregiment (King's Infantry Regiment) Nr. 106
  First Brigade of Imperial Guards, commander, 1914–15

Orders and decorations
German decorations

Foreign decorations

Honours
Two ships were named after Prince Eitel, the passenger ship Prince Eitel Friedrich (1901) and the Reich postal steamer Prince Eitel Friedrich (1904).

Ancestry

References

Sources
Schench, G.  Handbuch über den Königlich Preuβischen Hof und Staat fur das Jahr 1908. Berlin, Prussia, 1907.

Prussian princes
1883 births
1942 deaths
House of Hohenzollern
German Army generals of World War I
Major generals of Prussia
Stahlhelm members
German monarchists
Recipients of the Pour le Mérite (military class)
Recipients of the Iron Cross (1914), 1st class
Officers Crosses of the Military Merit Order (Bavaria)
Recipients of the Hanseatic Cross
Grand Crosses of the Order of Saint Stephen of Hungary
Recipients of the Order of the Netherlands Lion
2
2
Grand Crosses of the Order of the Crown (Romania)
Crosses of Military Merit
Annulled Honorary Knights Grand Cross of the Royal Victorian Order
Sons of emperors
Military personnel from Potsdam
Children of Wilhelm II, German Emperor
Sons of kings